Villa Grove may refer to a place in the United States:

Villa Grove, Colorado
Villa Grove, Illinois